Luxorius may refer to:

 Luxorius (poet), an Ancient Roman poet and writer in the 6th century
 Luxorius (saint), an ancient Roman official on Sardinia in the late 3rd and early 4th centuries